A Midsummer Night's Dream is a 1595 play by William Shakespeare.

A Midsummer Night's Dream may also refer to:

Arts
 A Midsummer Night's Dream (Mendelssohn), an overture (1826) and incidental music (1842) by Felix Mendelssohn
 A Midsummer Night's Dream (opera), a 1960 opera by Benjamin Britten
 A Midsummer Night's Dream (ballet), a 1962 ballet by George Balanchine, set to Mendelssohn's music 
 "Midsummer Night's Dream" (Oh my Goddess! episode), a manga episode
 RSC production of A Midsummer Night's Dream (1970), directed by Peter Brook
 A Midsummer Night's Dream, a 1997 album by Steve Hackett

Film
 A Midsummer Night's Dream (1909 film), an American silent film
 A Midsummer Night's Dream (1935 film), an American film directed by Max Reinhardt and William Dieterle
 A Midsummer Night's Dream (1959 film), a Czechoslovakian puppet version by Jiří Trnka
 A Midsummer Night's Dream (1968 film), a British film directed by Peter Hall
 A Midsummer Night's Dream (1969 film), a French television film directed by Jean-Christophe Averty
 A Midsummer Night's Dream (1981 film), a BBC Television Shakespeare production directed by Elijah Moshinsky
 A Midsummer Night's Dream (1999 film), a British-American-Italian film directed by Michael Hoffman
 A Midsummer Night's Dream (2016 film), a British television film directed by David Kerr
 A Midsummer Night's Dream (2017 film), an American modernized version by Casey Wilder Mott
 xxxHolic: A Midsummer Night's Dream, a 2005 Japanese anime film

See also
 Helena (A Midsummer Night's Dream)
 The Dream (ballet), a 1964 ballet by Sir Frederick Ashton, set to Mendelssohn's music 
 A Midsummer Night's Gene, a 1997 sci-fi parody novel of Shakespeare's play
 A Midsummer Night's Rave, a 2002 rave take on Shakespeare's play
 A Midsummer Night's Sex Comedy, a 1982 film written and directed by Woody Allen
 A Midsummer's Nightmare (novel), a 1997 novel by Garry Kilworth
 Le songe d'une nuit d'été, an 1850 opera by Ambroise Thomas with the same French title as, but not based on, the Shakespeare play
 Summer Day's Dream, a 1949 play by J. B. Priestley framed partially around a performance of A Midsummer Night's Dream
 "A Midsummer's Nice Dream", a 2011 episode of The Simpsons
 Shakespeare for Squirrels, a 2020 fantasy novel based on Shakespeare's play, by Christopher Moore
 Midsummer (disambiguation)